The bumpa, or pumpa, is a ritual ewer or vase with a spout used in Tibetan Buddhist rituals and empowerment. It is believed, in some contexts, to be the vessel for the expanse of the universe.

There are two kinds of bumpa: the tso bum, or main vase, and the le bum or activity vase. The main vase is usually placed in the center of the mandala, while the activity vase is placed on the Lama's table and is used by the Chöpön, or ritual specialist, during rituals and empowerments.

The bumpa empowerment is the main ritual empowerment activity in Kriyayoga Tantra.

See also
 Kumbha
 Kalasha

References

Tibetan Buddhist ritual implements
Buddhist symbols